The Mediterranean spearfish (Tetrapturus belone) is a species of marlin native to the Mediterranean Sea where it is particularly common around Italy, although there is a probable record of one caught off Madeira. It is an open-water fish, being found within  of the surface. This species can reach a length of  TL. The heaviest recorded specimen weighed in at   This species is of minor importance to commercial fisheries.

References

Fish of the Mediterranean Sea
Tetrapturus
Fish described in 1810
Taxa named by Constantine Samuel Rafinesque